Bushnitskaya is a rural locality (a village) in Morozovskoye Rural Settlement, Verkhovazhsky District, Vologda Oblast, Russia. The population was 3 as of 2002.

Geography 
Bushnitskaya is located 35 km west of Verkhovazhye (the district's administrative centre) by road. Ostrovskaya is the nearest rural locality.

References 

Rural localities in Verkhovazhsky District